Daleti, also spelled Daletti, is a town in central Ethiopia. Located in the Sebeta Hawas district, Daleti is a suburban village predominantly inhabited by the Tigri Werji people. Notable cities and locations near this town are Sebeta Hawas, Sebeta, Tulluu Furii, and Addis Ababa, the capital city of Ethiopia which Daleti is only a rough 20 km away from its center.

Note
Note: There is another market town in Oromia Region officially named Daleti and it is located in the Yaya Gulele district of the North Shewa Zone.

References

Oromia Region